Bucculatrix endospiralis is a moth of the  family Bucculatricidae. It was described by G. Deschka in 1981. It is found in Iran and Yemen.

References

Bucculatricidae
Moths described in 1981
Moths of the Arabian Peninsula
Moths of Asia